Sediliopsis riosi is a species of sea snail, a marine gastropod mollusk in the family Pseudomelatomidae, the turrids and allies.

Description
The length of the shell attains 15 mm.

Distribution
This species occurs in the South Atlantic Ocean off Brazil.

References

 Don I. Tippett, Taxonomic notes on the western Atlantic Turridae (Gastropoda: Conoidea); the Nautilus v. 109 (1995-1996)

External links
 
 Gastropods.com: Sediliopsis riosi

riosi
Gastropods described in 1995